The Pacific Islands are a group of islands in the Pacific Ocean. THey are further categorized into three major island groups: Melanesia, Micronesia, and Polynesia. Depending on the context, the term Pacific Islands may refer to one of several different concepts: (1) those countries and islands with common Austronesian origins, (2) the islands once (or currently) colonized, or (3) the geographical region of Oceania.

This list of islands in the Pacific Ocean is organized by archipelago or political boundary. In order to keep this list of moderate size, the more complete lists for countries with large numbers of small or uninhabited islands have been hyperlinked.

Name ambiguity and groupings 
The umbrella term Pacific Islands has taken on several meanings. Sometimes it is used to refer only to the islands defined as lying within Oceania. At other times, it is used to refer to the islands of the Pacific Ocean that were previously colonized by the British, French, Spaniards, Portuguese, Dutch, or Japanese, or by the United States. Examples include Borneo, the Pitcairn Islands and Taiwan (also known as Formosa).

A commonly applied biogeographic definition includes islands with oceanic geology that lie within Melanesia, Micronesia, Polynesia and the eastern Pacific (also known as the southeastern Pacific). These are usually considered to be the "Tropical Pacific Islands". In the 1990s, ecologists Dieter Mueller-Dombois and Frederic Raymond Fosberg broke the Tropical Pacific Islands up into the following subdivisions:

Western Melanesia
The Bismarck Archipelago and other islands directly east of New Guinea
Bougainville and Buka Island
The Solomon Islands
Eastern Melanesia
The Santa Cruz Islands
Vanuatu
New Caledonia
Fiji
Subtropical islands in the Australia/New Zealand region
Lord Howe Island
Norfolk Island
Micronesia
The Bonin Islands and Volcano Islands
Marcus Island
The Northern Marianas
The Southern Marianas
The Caroline Islands
Nauru and Banaba
Wake Island
The Marshall Islands
The Gilbert Islands (Kiribati)
Central Polynesia
Johnston Atoll
The Phoenix Islands
The Line Islands
Howland Island, Baker Island, Jarvis Island, Malden Island and Starbuck Island
Tuvalu, Tokelau and the Northern Cook Islands (Pukapuka, Nassau, Rakahanga, Manihiki, Penrhyn, Suwarrow and Palmerston)
Western Polynesia
Tonga
Samoa
Wallis and Futuna
Niue
Eastern Polynesia
The rest of the Cook Islands
The Austral Islands
The Society Islands
The Tuamotu Archipelago and the Pitcairn Islands
Easter Island and Salas y Gómez
The Marquesas Islands
Northern Polynesia
The Hawaiian Islands
Oceanic islands of the Eastern Pacific
The Revillagigedo Islands
Cocos Island and Malpelo Island
Clipperton Island
The Galápagos Islands
The Desventuradas Islands
The Juan Fernández Islands

Geopolitics and Oceania grouping 

The 2007 book Asia in the Pacific Islands: Replacing the West, by New Zealand Pacific scholar Ron Crocombe, considers the phrase Pacific Islands to politically encompass American Samoa, Australia, the Bonin Islands, the Cook Islands, Easter Island, East Timor, Federated States of Micronesia, Fiji, French Polynesia, the Galápagos Islands, Guam, Hawaii, the Kermadec Islands, Kiribati, Lord Howe Island, the Marshall Islands, Nauru, New Caledonia, New Zealand, Norfolk Island, Niue, the Northern Mariana Islands, Palau, Papua New Guinea, Pitcairn Islands, Samoa, the Solomon Islands, Tokelau, Tonga, Tuvalu, Vanuatu, the Torres Strait Islands, Wallis and Futuna, Western New Guinea and the United States Minor Outlying Islands (Baker Island, Howland Island, Jarvis Island, Midway Atoll, Palmyra Atoll and Wake Island). Crocombe noted that Easter Island, Lord Howe Island, Norfolk Island, the Galápagos Islands, the Kermadec Islands, the Pitcairn Islands and the Torres Strait Islands currently have no geopolitical connections to Asia, but that they could be of future strategic importance in the Asia-Pacific. Another definition given in the book for the term Pacific Islands is islands served by the Pacific Community, formerly known as the South Pacific Commission. It is a developmental organization whose members include Australia and the aforementioned islands which are not politically part of other countries. In his 1962 book War in the Pacific: Strategy and Command, American author Louis Morton places the insular landmasses of the Pacific under the label of the "Pacific World". He considers it to encompass areas that were involved in the Pacific Theater of World War II. These areas include the islands of Melanesia, Micronesia and Polynesia, as well as Australia, the Aleutian Islands, Indonesia, Japan, the Philippines, the Ryukyu Islands and Taiwan.

Since the beginning of the 19th century, Australia and the islands of the Pacific have been grouped by geographers into a region called Oceania. It is often used as a quasi-continent, with the Pacific Ocean being the defining characteristic. In some countries, such as Argentina, Brazil, China, Chile, Costa Rica, Ecuador, France, Greece, Italy, Mexico, the Netherlands, Peru, Spain, Switzerland or Venezuela, Oceania is seen as a proper continent in the sense that it is "one of the parts of the world". In his 1879 book Australasia, British naturalist Alfred Russel Wallace commented that, "Oceania is the word often used by continental geographers to describe the great world of islands we are now entering upon" and that "Australia forms its central and most important feature." 19th century definitions encompassed the region as beginning in the Malay Archipelago, and as ending near the Americas. In the 19th century, many geographers divided up Oceania into mostly racially-based subdivisions; Australasia, Malaysia (encompassing the Malay Archipelago), Melanesia, Micronesia and Polynesia. The 1995 book The Pacific Island States, by Australian author Stephen Henningham, claims that Oceania in its broadest sense "incorporates all the insular areas between the Americas and Asia." In its broadest possible usage, it could include Australia, the Melanesian, Micronesian and Polynesian islands, the Japanese and Malay Archipelagos, Taiwan, the Ryukyu and Kuril Islands, the Aleutian Islands and isolated islands off Latin America such as the Juan Fernández Islands. Islands with geological and historical ties to the Asian mainland (such as those in the Malay Archipelago) are rarely included in present definitions of Oceania, nor are non-tropical islands to the north of Hawaii. The 2004 book The Making of Anthropology: The Semiotics of Self and Other in the Western Tradition, by Jacob Pandian and Susan Parman, states that "some exclude from Oceania the nontropical islands such as Ryukyu, the Aleutian islands and Japan, and the islands such as Formosa, Indonesia and the Philippines that are closely linked with mainland Asia. Others include Indonesia and the Philippines with the heartland of Oceania." 

Certain anthropological definitions restrict Oceania even further to only include islands which are culturally within Melanesia, Micronesia and Polynesia. Conversely, Encyclopedia Britannica believe that the term Pacific Islands is much more synonymous with Melanesia, Micronesia and Polynesia, and that Oceania, in its broadest sense, embraces all the areas of the Pacific which do not fall within Melanesia, Micronesia and Polynesia. The World Factbook and the United Nations categorize Oceania/the Pacific area as one of the seven major continental divisions of the world, and the two organizations consider it to politically encompass American Samoa, Australia, Christmas Island, Cocos (Keeling) Islands, the Cook Islands, Federated States of Micronesia, French Polynesia, Fiji, Guam, Kiribati, the Marshall Islands, Nauru, New Caledonia, New Zealand, Niue, Norfolk Island, the Northern Mariana Islands, Palau, Papua New Guinea, Pitcairn Islands, Samoa, the Solomon Islands, Tokelau, Tonga, Tuvalu, Vanuatu, Wallis and Futuna and the United States Minor Outlying Islands.

Since the 1950s, many (particularly in English-speaking countries) have viewed Australia as a continent-sized landmass, although they are still sometimes viewed as a Pacific Island, or as both a continent and a Pacific Island. Australia is a founding member of the Pacific Islands Forum, which is now recognized as the main governing body for the Oceania region. It functions as a trade bloc and deals with defense issues, unlike with the Pacific Community, which includes most of the same members. By 2021, the Pacific Islands Forum included all sovereign Pacific Island nations, such as Federated States of Micronesia, Fiji and Tonga, in addition to dependencies of other nations, such as American Samoa, French Polynesia and Guam. Islands which have been fully integrated into other nations, including Easter Island (Chile) and Hawaii (United States), have also shown interest in joining. Tony deBrum, Foreign Minister for the Marshall Islands, stated in 2014, "Not only [is Australia] our big brother down south, Australia is a member of the Pacific Islands Forum and Australia is a Pacific island, a big island, but a Pacific island."  Japan and certain nations of the Malay Archipelago (including East Timor, Indonesia and the Philippines) have representation in the Pacific Islands Forum, but none are full members. The nations of the Malay Archipelago have their own regional governing organization called ASEAN, which includes mainland Southeast Asian nations such as Vietnam and Thailand. In July 2019, at the inaugural Indonesian Exposition held in Auckland, Indonesia launched its ‘Pacific Elevation’ program, which would encompass a new era of elevated engagement with the region, with the country also using the event to lay claim that Indonesia is culturally and ethnically linked to the Pacific islands. The event was attended by dignitaries from Australia, New Zealand and some Pacific island countries.

List of the largest Pacific islands 
Islands of the Pacific Ocean proper, with an area larger than 10,000 km2.

By continent

Antarctica
 List of Antarctic and subantarctic islands

Asia
 List of islands of Asia
 List of islands of China
 Japanese Archipelago of 6,852 islands
 List of islands of Japan
 List of islands of Indonesia
 List of islands of North Korea
 List of islands of the Philippines
 List of islands of Russia
 List of islands of South Korea
 List of islands of Vietnam

North America
 Central American Pacific Islands
 List of islands of North America
 List of islands of Canada, section British Columbia
 List of islands of Mexico
 List of islands of the United States

Oceania
 List of islands of Australia
List of islands of Britain
 List of islands of the Pitcairn Islands
 List of islands of Fiji
 List of islands of France, section Pacific Ocean
 List of islands of Hawaii
 List of islands of Kiribati
 List of islands of the Marshall Islands
 List of islands of New Zealand
 List of Islands of Papua New Guinea
 List of islands of the Solomon Islands
 List of islands of Tonga
 List of islands of Tuvalu
 List of islands of the United States, section Insular areas
 List of islands of Vanuatu

South America
 List of islands of South America
 List of islands of Chile
 List of islands of Colombia
 List of islands of Ecuador
 List of islands of Peru

By country

American Samoa
 American Samoa
 Aunuu
 Ofu-Olosega
 Rose Atoll
 Swains Island (Olosenga, Olohega) (Disputed)
 Tau
 Tutuila

Australia
 List of islands of Australia, including:
 Coral Sea Islands
 Willis Island
 Lord Howe Island
 Norfolk Island
 Torres Strait Islands

Canada
 List of islands of British Columbia, many islands including:
 Haida Gwaii, some 400 islands near Alaska
 Graham Island, the main northern island
 Moresby Island, the main southern island
 Vancouver Island, Canada's largest Pacific island
 Gulf Islands, numerous islands off the southeast coast of V.I. near the U.S. San Juan Islands

Chile
 Chiloé Island
 Desventuradas Islands 
 Easter Island/Rapa Nui 
 Isla Salas y Gómez 
 Juan Fernández Islands

China
List of islands of China

Colombia
 Gorgona Island 
 Malpelo Island

Cook Islands
 Aitutaki
 Atiu
 Pamati (Palmerston)
 Mangaia
 Manihiki (Humphrey)
 Manuae (Hervey)
 Mauke (Parry)
 Mitiaro (Nukuroa)
 Nassau
 Pukapuka (Danger)
 Rakahanga (Reirson)
 Rarotonga
 Suwarrow (Anchorage)
 Takutea
 Tongareva (Penrhyn)

Costa Rica
 Cocos Island

Ecuador
 Galapagos Islands
 Puná Island

Fiji

 Principal islands:
 Viti Levu
 Vanua Levu
 Significant outliers:
 Conway Reef
 Kadavu Island
 Taveuni
 Rotuma Island
 Archipelagos:
 Kadavu Group
 Lau Islands
 Lomaiviti Islands
 Mamanuca Islands
 Moala Islands
 Ringgold Isles
 Rotuma Group
 Vanua Levu Group
 Viti Levu Group
 Yasawa Islands

France
 Clipperton Island

French Polynesia
 French Polynesia (Autonomous Overseas Territory of France)
 Austral Islands
 Tubuai
 Society Islands
 Windward Islands
 Moorea
 Tahiti
 Tetiaroa
 Maiao
 Mehetia
 Leeward Islands
 Bora Bora
 Huahine
 Maupiti
 Raiatea & Tahaa
 Tupai
 Mopelia (Maupihaa)
 Manuae (Scilly Atoll)
 Motu One (Bellinghausen)
 Marquesas
 Fatu Hiva
 Hiva Oa
 Euba
 Nuku Hiva
 Tahuata
 Ua Huka Pen
 Ua Pou
 Tuamotus
 Rangiroa
 Fakarava
 Moruroa
 Fangataufa
 Gambier Islands
 Mangareva
 Helena Island

Guam 
 Guam

Hong Kong
 List of islands of Hong Kong
 Hong Kong Island
 Lantau

Indonesia
 Western New Guinea

Japan
 List of islands of Japan, including:
The five main islands:
Hokkaido - the northernmost and second largest main island.
Honshu - the largest and most populous island; home of the capital Tokyo.
Kyushu - the third largest main island and closest to the Asian continent.
Shikoku - the second smallest main island after Okinawa; between Honshu and Kyushu
Okinawa Island - the smallest and southernmost of the main islands
 Other notable islands:
 Marcus Island
 Okinotori Islands

Kiribati
List of islands of Kiribati:
 Caroline Island
 Flint Island 
 Gilbert Islands
 Line Islands (8 of 11)
 Kiritimati/Christmas Island
 Malden Island
 Phoenix Islands 
 Starbuck Island 
 Tabuaeran/Fanning Island 
 Teraina/Washington Island
 Vostok Island

Macau
 List of islands of Macau

Malaysia
 Sipadan

Marshall Islands
 Marshall Islands
 Bikini
 Enewetak
 Kwajalein
 Rongelap
 Majuro

Mexico
 Cedros Island
 Tiburón Island
 Revillagigedo Islands 
 Rocas Alijos 
 Guadalupe Island

Micronesia
Islands of Federated States of Micronesia
 Caroline Islands
 Pohnpei
 Yap
 Ulithi
 Chuuk
 Puluwat
 Kosrae

Nauru
 Nauru, a country and single island

New Caledonia
 New Caledonia (special collectivity of France)
 Grande Terre (New Caledonia)
 Chesterfield Islands
 Ilots du Mouillage
 Isle of Pines
 Belep Islands
 New Caledonia
 Loyalty Islands
 Bagao
 Lifou Island
 Maré Island
 Ouvéa Island
 Tiga Island
 Matthew Island and Hunter Island, administered by France as part of New Caledonia but also claimed by Vanuatu

New Zealand
Islands of New Zealand, around 600 islands including:
 Auckland Islands
 Chatham Islands
 Chatham Island
 Pitt Island
 d'Urville Island
 Great Barrier Island
 Kapiti Island
 Kermadec Islands
 Macauley Island
 Raoul Island
 North Island
 South Island
 Stewart Island/Rakiura
 Waiheke Island

Niue
 Niue, a country and single island

Northern Mariana Islands
 Northern Mariana Islands
 Saipan
 Rota
 Tinian
 Maug
 Pagan Island
 Alamagan
 Farallon de Pajaros

Palau
Palau has over 250 islands, including:
 Angaur
 Babeldaob
 Caroline Islands
 Kayangel
 Ngerekebesang Island
 Oreor
 Peleliu
 Southwest Islands

Panama
 Pearl Islands

Papua New Guinea
 List of islands of Papua New Guinea
 New Guinea, eastern half
 Bismarck Archipelago
 Admiralty Islands
 Manus Island
 Karkar Island
 New Britain
 New Ireland
 Saint Matthias Group
 Solomon Islands archipelago (northern part)
 Bougainville
 Buka Island
 Trobriand Islands
 Kiriwina
 Woodlark Island
 D'Entrecasteaux Islands
Fergusson Island
Goodenough Island
Normanby Island (Papua New Guinea)
 Louisiade Archipelago
 Misima Island
 Tagula Island or Sudest Island
 Rossel Island
 Samarai
 Daru Island
 Kiwai Island

Philippines
 List of islands of the Philippines, over 7600 islands including:
 Miangas
 Spratly Islands
 Island of Palmas
 Scarborough Shoal

Russia
 List of islands of Russia
 Kuril Islands
 Sakhalin

Samoa
 List of islands of Samoa:
 Samoa (western part of the Samoa Islands)
 Savai'i
 Upolu
 Apolima
 Manono
 Nuutele

Solomon Islands
 Islands of the Solomon Islands
 Bellona
 Choiseul
 Florida Island
 Guadalcanal
 Malaita
 Maramasike
 New Georgia Islands
 Rennell
 Russell Islands
 San Cristobal
 Santa Cruz Islands
 Santa Isabel
 Shortland Islands
 Sikaiana (Stewart Islands)
 Tulagi
 Ulawa
 Uki

Taiwan 
 List of islands of Taiwan, 166 islands including:
 Taiwan, the main island with over 99% of the country's total area

Tokelau
List of islands of Tokelau
 Tokelau (mostly autonomous), three coral atolls with about 25 islands combined, including:
 Olohega (Swains Island), administered by the United States as part of American Samoa, but claimed by Tokelau due to geography, history and language

Tonga
 List of islands in Tonga; in north to south order:
 Niuafoou
 Niuatoputapu (Keppel's Island)
 Vavau
 Kao
 Tofua
 Haapai
 Tongatapu
 Eua

Tuvalu
 Islands of Tuvalu
 Funafuti (atoll of at least 30 islands)
 Nanumanga (or Nanumaga)
 Nanumea (atoll of at least 6 islands)
 Niulakita
 Niutao
 Nui (atoll of at least 21 islands)
 Nukufetau (atoll of at least 33 islands)
 Nukulaelae (atoll of at least 15 islands)
 Vaitupu (atoll of at least 9 islands)

United Kingdom

 Pitcairn Islands, four islands:
 Pitcairn Island
 Henderson Island
 Oeno Island
 Ducie Island

United States
 Alaska, many islands including:
 Aleutian Islands 
 Alexander Archipelago
 Nunivak Island
 St. Lawrence Island
 List of islands of California
 Channel Islands
 Hawaiian Islands, many islands and islets including:
 Hawaii
 Kahoolawe
 Kauai
 Ka'ula
 Lanai
 Maui
 Molokai
 Niihau
 Oahu
 Northwestern Hawaiian Islands
 Kure
 Nihoa
 Necker
 French Frigate Shoals
 Gardner Pinnacles
 Maro Reef
 Laysan
 Lisianski
 Pearl and Hermes Reef
 List of islands of Oregon
 Oregon Islands National Wildlife Refuge
 United States Minor Outlying Islands, eight small island groups between Hawaii and the Philippines (e.g. Johnston Atoll, Midway Atoll, Wake Atoll)
 List of islands of Washington state
 Islands of Puget Sound
 San Juan Islands

Vanuatu
List of islands of Vanuatu, some 83 islands including (north to south approximately):
 Torres Islands
 Banks Islands
 Espiritu Santo
 Malakula
 Ambrym
 Paama
 Epi
 Shepherd Islands
 Efate, home of the national capital Port Vila
 Lelepa
 Erromango
 Tanna
 Disputed:
 Matthew Island and Hunter Island, administered by France as part of New Caledonia but also claimed by Vanuatu

Wallis and Futuna
 Wallis and Futuna
 Alofi
 Futuna
 Wallis (Uvea)

Notes

 
Pacific
Pacific Ocean-related lists